Mary Kornman (born Mary Agnes Evans, December 27, 1915 – June 1, 1973) was an American child actress who was the leading female star of the Our Gang series during the Pathé silent era.

Our Gang
She was born as Mary Agnes Evans, the daughter of Verna Comer, who appeared in several films, and David Lionel Evans. Her stepfather, Hal Roach′s still-photo cameraman Eugene Kornman adopted Mary after he and Mary's mother were married in 1921. After Peggy Cartwright, who appeared in only four or five Our Gang episodes, Mary became the leading lady of the series, appearing in more than 40 episodes. Kornman was one of the series′ biggest stars during its early years between 1922 and 1926. After outgrowing the Our Gang series, she and fellow Our Gang alumnus Johnny Downs spent several years performing as a team on the college and vaudeville circuits.

Mildred Kornman
Her younger sister, Mildred. was also a child actress. Mildred was featured as a regular in Our Gang from 1926–28, and made further appearances until 1935. She had no speaking roles and appeared when many children were needed for a scene such as a classroom. She later achieved a degree of fame as an adult fashion model known as Ricki VanDusen.  

When asked in 1960 what she thought of being part of Our Gang, Mildred Kornman replied "It was fun being a gang member. It was play. I have no regrets...We didn't have to be talented, which is natural for kids ... I think we had a privileged childhood working in those films."

Later years and death
Mary continued working with Our Gang co-star Mickey Daniels into adulthood, as evidenced by some publicity shots from the era. She appeared with Mickey in the teen version of Our Gang, The Boy Friends.  In 1934, she married Leo Tover, a cameraman, but divorced approximately five years later. 

Throughout the 1930s, she continued to appear in many features such as the serial Queen of the Jungle (1935), and The Desert Trail (1935) starring John Wayne. She retired from the screen in 1940.

She later married Ralph B. McCutcheon, a horse trainer on some of her Western films. Mary spent the rest of her life devoted to him. They had no children. They both spent their remaining years on their ranch with the horses. She kept close with her Hollywood acquaintances and friends. When asked if Mary was as kind and genuine a person as she appeared to be onscreen, her sister Mildred replied, "She was all of that and more." 

Mary became gravely ill in the early 1970s and was eventually diagnosed with cancer. She died on June 1, 1973, aged 57. Her widower died two years later. They are interred at Linn Grove Cemetery, Greeley, Colorado.

Filmography

Our Gang Shorts

The Champeen (1923) - Mary
The Cobbler (1923) - Mary, 'Little Miss Riches'
The Big Show (1923) - Mary
A Pleasant Journey (1923) - Mary
Dogs of War (1923) - Mary
Lodge Night (1923) - Mary
July Days (1923) - Mary
No Noise (1923) - Mary
Stage Fright (1923) - Mary
Derby Day (1923) - Mary
Tire Trouble (1924) - Mary
Big Business (1924) - Mary
The Buccaneers (1924) - Mary
Seein′ Things (1924) - Mary
Commencement Day (1924) - Mary
Cradle Robbers (1924) - Mary
Jubilo, Jr. (1924) - Mary
It′s a Bear (1924) - Mary
High Society (1924) - Mary
The Sun Down Limited (1924) - Mary
Every Man for Himself (1924) - Mary
Fast Company (1924) - Mary
The Big Town (1925) - Mary
Circus Fever (1925) - Mary
Dog Days (1925) - Mary
The Love Bug (1925) - Mary
Shootin′ Injuns (1925) - Mary
Ask Grandma (1925) - Mary
Official Officers (1925) - Mary
Boys Will Be Joys (1925) - Mary
Mary, Queen of Tots (1925) - Mary
Your Own Back Yard (1925) - Mary
Better Movies (1925) - Mary
One Wild Ride (1925) - Mary
Good Cheer (1926) - Mary
Buried Treasure (1926) - Mary
Monkey Business (1926) - Mary
Baby Clothes (1926) - Mary
Uncle Tom′s Uncle (1926) - Mary
Thundering Fleas (1926) - Mary
Shivering Spooks (1926) - Mary
The Fourth Alarm (1926) - Mary
Fish Hooky (1933) - Mary (Guest Appearance)
Reunion in Rhythm (1937) - Mary (Guest Appearance)

The Boy Friends Shorts

Doctor′s Orders (1930) - Mary
Bigger and Better (1930) - Mary
Ladies Last (1930) - Mary
Blood and Thunder (1931) - Mary
High Gear (1931) - Mary
Love Fever (1931) - Mary
Air-Tight (1931) - Mary
Call a Cop! (1931) - Mary
Mama Loves Papa (1931) - Mary
The Kick-Off! (1931) - Mary
Love Pains (1932) - Mary
The Knock-Out (1932) - Mary
Too Many Women (1932) - Mary
Wild Babies (1932) - Mary

Other Shorts and Feature Length Films

 Are These Our Children? (1931) - Agnes "Dumbbell"
 Exposure (1932) - Eileen Foster - Socialite (uncredited)
 Me and My Pal (1933, Short) - Bridesmaid (uncredited)
 Bondage (1933) - Bit in Record Store (uncredited)
 College Humor (1933) - Amber Davis
 Neighbors' Wives (1933) - Mary McGrath
 Please (1933, Short) - Beth Sawyer
 Flying Down to Rio (1933) - Belinha's Friend (uncredited)
 Just an Echo (1934, Short)
 The Quitter (1934) - Annabelle Hibbs
 Picture Brides (1934) - Mataeo Rogers
 Strictly Dynamite (1934) - Party Girl (uncredited)
 Madame Du Barry (1934) - Sweet Pea (uncredited)
 Smokey Smith (1935) - Bess Bart
 The Quitter (1934) - Annabelle Hibbs
 Roaring Roads (1935) - Mary McDowell
 The Desert Trail (1935) - Anne
 Adventurous Knight (1935) - Annette
 Queen of the Jungle (1935, Serial) - Joan Lawrence / Mary Lawrence
 The Calling of Dan Matthews (1935) - Kitty Marley
 Swing It, Professor (1937) - Joan Dennis
 Youth on Parole (1937) - Mae Blair
 King of the Newsboys (1938) - Peggy
 That Certain Age (1938) - Friend (uncredited)
 I Am a Criminal (1938) - Alice Martin
 Zenobia (1939) - Townswoman (uncredited)
 On the Spot (1940) - Ruth Hunter (final film role)
 Shiny (1963) - Lady (final film role)

Errata
There is some discrepancy concerning which of the early Our Gang films Mary actually appeared in. According to The Lucky Corner website, Mary did not appear in any of the following four films.

One Terrible Day (1922), listed by the Internet Movie Data Base
Young Sherlocks (1922), listed by the Internet Movie Data Base and by Maltin and Bann
Saturday Morning (1922), listed by the Internet Movie Data Base
A Quiet Street (1922), listed by the Internet Movie Data Base

References

External links

 
 
 
 
 The Lucky Corner

1915 births
1973 deaths
Actresses from Idaho
American film actresses
American child actresses
Deaths from cancer in California
People from Idaho Falls, Idaho
Burials in Colorado
20th-century American actresses
Hal Roach Studios actors
Our Gang